Iloni is a village in the commune of Dembeni on Mayotte Island.

Populated places in Mayotte